George Smart may refer to:
George Thomas Smart (1776–1867), English musician
George Smart (footballer) (1890–1941), English footballer
George Smart (tailor) (1774–1846), English tailor and artist
George Smart (inventor) (died 1834), British inventor of a device for cleaning chimneys